Pseudobersama is a monotypic genus of flowering plants belonging to the family Meliaceae. The only species is Pseudobersama mossambicensis.

Its native range is Kenya to KwaZulu-Natal. It is dioecious.

References

Meliaceae
Meliaceae genera
Monotypic Sapindales genera
Dioecious plants